The Unalachtigo were a purported division of the Lenape (Delaware Indians), a Native American tribe whose homeland Lenapehoking was in what is today the Northeastern United States. They were part of the Forks Indians.

The name was a Munsee language term for the Unami-speakers of west-central New Jersey. Moravian missionaries called the Lenape people of the Forks region near Easton, Pennsylvania "Unami," and the Northern Unami language-speakers in New Jersey "Unalachtigo." It is debated whether Unalachtigo constituted a distinct dialect of Unami. Unalachtigo words were recorded in 17th-century vocabulary drawn from the Sankhikan band of Lenape in New Jersey.

The Sankhikan band were enemies of the Manhattan people, who spoke Munsee

Synonymy
"Unalachtigo" probably came from the term wə̆nálâhtko·w, which according to Ives Goddard has an unknown translation. Some sources translate unalachtigo as meaning "people who live near the ocean", or "people who live down by the water" Other spellings include Unalâchtigo (1818) and Wunalàchtigo (1798).

History
Linguist Ives Goddard has determined that the Unalachtigo had their origins around the Lehigh Valley of Pennsylvania, and adjacent portions of New Jersey. They spoke a Northern Unami or Southern Unami dialect of Lënape.

Recent events
An unrecognized tribe called the Unalachtigo Band of the Nanticoke Lenni Lenape Nation claims descent from the Lenape of the Brotherton Reservation, an 18th-century Indian reservation, near Shamong Township in Burlington County, New Jersey. The group unsuccessfully filed for federal recognition with the Bureau of Indian Affairs on 1 Feb 2002. In 2005, the Unalachtigo Band of the Nanticoke Lenni Lenape Nation and their tribal chairman James Brent Thomas Sr. sued the State of New Jersey and Governor Donald DiFrancesco for restoration of the Brotherton Reservation lands and the expulsion of non-Indian peoples. Their complaint was dismissed by the Superior Court of New Jersey.

Notes

Citations

References
 Goddard, Ives. "Eastern Algonquian Languages." Bruce G. Trigger, vol. ed. Handbook of North American Indians, Volume 15: Northwest. Washington DC: Smithsonian Institution, 1978: 70–77. .
 Goddard. "Delaware." Bruce G. Trigger, vol. ed. Handbook of North American Indians, Volume 15: Northwest. Washington DC: Smithsonian Institution, 1978: 213–239. .
 Newman, Andrew. On Records: Delaware Indians, Colonists, and the Media of History and Memory. Lincoln: University of Nebraska Press, 2012. .

External links 
Unalachtigo Band of the Nanticoke-Lenni Lenape v. State of New Jersey

Lenape
Native American tribes in New Jersey
Algonquian ethnonyms
Unrecognized tribes in the United States